Ameura is an extinct genus of trilobite belonging to the family Proetidae. Fossils from the genus have been found in late Paleozoic beds in North America.

References 

Paleozoic arthropods
Proetidae
Trilobite genera